Jennifer Victorine van Dijk-Silos (born 13 December 1954) is a Surinamese politician of the National Democratic Party. She was Minister of Justice and Police between August 2015 and March 2017.

Career
In August 2015 Van Dijk-Silos was appointed as Minister of Justice and Police. She succeeded Edward Belfort.

Van Dijk-Silos was chair of the Independent Electoral Commission (Dutch:Onafhankelijke Kiescommissie) for twelve years before she was appointed as minister. She also had her own law firm, which she transferred to her daughter.

On 7 July 2016 the opposition parties Democratic Alternative '91 and Surinamese Labour Party, demanded the resignation of Van Dijk-Silos due to comments she had made about the trial over the December murders. The next day more parliamentarians joined the call. Van Dijk-Silos reacted by first saying she had no message to the calls for her resignation and subsequently that the opposition parliamentarians had lied in their letter to President Dési Bouterse.

On 21 March 2017 Van Dijk-Silos was asked to resign by President Dési Bouterse, he cited her troublesome relations with the judicial power as reason. Judges of the  earlier withdrew support for her in a letter, stating that she was "impossible to communicate and cooperate with". Van Dijk-Silos refused to resign and she was subsequently relieved of her position with honor by Bouterse. On 23 March 2017 Van Dijk-Silos was succeeded by Ferdinand Welzijn in an interim capacity.

References

1954 births
Living people
Government ministers of Suriname
National Democratic Party (Suriname) politicians
20th-century Surinamese lawyers
Women government ministers of Suriname
21st-century women politicians
20th-century women lawyers
21st-century Surinamese lawyers